Awutu-Senya West is one of the constituencies represented in the Parliament of Ghana. It elects one Member of Parliament (MP) by the first past the post system of election. The Awutu-Senya West constituency is located in the Awutu Senya District of the Central Region of Ghana. In 2012, ahead of the 2012 elections, the Awutu-Senya West Constituency was carved out of the then Awutu-Senya constituency.

Boundaries 
The seat is located entirely within the Awutu Senya District of the Central Region of Ghana.

Members of Parliament

See also 

 List of Ghana Parliament constituencies
Awutu-Senya (Ghana parliament constituency)
 List of political parties in Ghana

References 

Parliamentary constituencies in the Central Region (Ghana)